Pitcairnia pungens is a plant species of bromeliad in the genus Pitcairnia. This species is native to Ecuador.

Pitcairnia × daiseyana is a natural hybrid of P. heterophylla and P. pungens.

References
 DEAD LINK

pungens
Flora of Ecuador